Chavin may refer to:

Places
 Chavín de Huantar, an archaeological site in Peru built by the Chavín culture
 Chavín District, Chincha, Peru
 Chavín de Huantar District, Huari, Peru
 Chavín de Pariarca District, Huamalies, Peru
 Chavin, Indre, a commune of the  Indre département in France
 Chavin, Iran, a village in Kurdistan Province, Iran
 The Chavín parish belonging to the municipality of Viveiro, Spain

Other uses
 Chinga Chavin, U.S. musician
 Chavín culture, an early culture of the Andean region, pre-dating the Moche culture in Peru
 Operation Chavín de Huántar, a Peruvian military operation that ended the 1997 Japanese embassy hostage crisis 
 Rhinella chavin (R. chavin), a species of toad

See also